Rolleston on Dove, also known simply as Rolleston, is a village and civil parish in the East Staffordshire district, in the county of Staffordshire, England near Burton upon Trent. Sir Oswald Mosley, the founder of the British Union of Fascists spent some of his earlier years at the family seat here. Rolleston Hall, where Mosley lived, was sold by auction on 2 August 1923 for housing development. The lake and two of the entrance lodges remain. The family coat of arms are still displayed in what was originally the Victorian Commemoration Hall which is now Rolleston Club.

Rolleston has an active group of residents (RODSEC) which organises many seasonal activities, including money raising events for local charities.

Rolleston on Dove was served by a railway station which was opened by the North Staffordshire Railway on 1 November 1894. The station closed in 1949.

Rolleston is also home to the Jinnie Trail, a former railway line in a man-made valley which was closed completely in 1968. In 1972 it was created into a rural walk stretching approximately 2 kilometres. Along the walk today, parts of the remaining stations are being revealed by an ongoing restoration project.

Rolleston was originally built around the hall, the church and the stream running through it, the Alder brook. The oldest area of the village, thought to date from the 11th century, is near the Spread Eagle Inn and Rolleston's Church, St. Mary's, together with Brookside and Burnside, although there are old houses in other places in the village.

On 28 March 1983 the parish was renamed from "Rolleston" to "Rolleston on Dove".

Notable residents
 Robert Sherborne (c.1453 in Rolleston on Dove – 1536) was Dean of St Paul's 1499–1505 and Bishop of Chichester 1508–1536. 
 Sir Oswald Mosley (1896–1980) politician who started in the Conservative Party migrated through the Labour Party via a party of his own creation to become English Fascist leader in the 1930s
 Robert W. Ford (1923–2013) British diplomat and radio operator arrested by the Chinese in Tibet after World War II.
 Andrew Webster (born 1959 in Rolleston on Dove) a former English cricketer who played first-class and List A cricket for Worcestershire

See also
Listed buildings in Rolleston on Dove

References

External links

Rolleston on Dove Village website
Rolleston-on-Dove village archive
Love Burton Rolleston Page

Villages in Staffordshire
Borough of East Staffordshire
Civil parishes in Staffordshire